Mark Levengood, (born 10 July 1964 in Lejeune Base Camp, North Carolina, in the United States), is a Finnish journalist, writer, and television host who is working in Sweden. He  is a Swedish-speaking Finn who grew up in Helsinki. He is the husband of Jonas Gardell. They have one child each, a boy, who is Gardell's biological child, and a girl, who is Levengood's child. Levengood was born to an American father and a Sweden-Finnish mother.

On April 1, 2008, Levengood was named UNICEF ambassador. He is a member of the board of the University of Gotland. Until 2018, Levengood has been a summer host this summer in P1 six times: June 27, 1993, June 22, 1996, July 4, 1999, June 24, 2007, June 25, 2011, and 28, 2018. Levengood was Vegas Summer Tapers in 2014. Levengood belongs to the Roman Catholic Church.

Amongst other shows he has hosted Melodifestivalen.

References

1964 births
Living people
People from Camp Lejeune, North Carolina
Finnish journalists
Swedish journalists
Finnish LGBT writers
Swedish LGBT writers
LGBT people from North Carolina
Finnish people of American descent
Swedish people of American descent
Swedish people of Finnish descent
Swedish-speaking Finns